Brykino is a rural locality (a village) in Andreyevskoye Rural Settlement, Sudogodsky District, Vladimir Oblast, Russia. The population was 21 as of 2010.

Geography 
The village is located 3 km east from Andreyevo, 23 km east from Sudogda.

References 

Rural localities in Sudogodsky District